This list is of the Places of Scenic Beauty of Japan located within the Prefecture of Ishikawa.

National Places of Scenic Beauty
As of 17 June 2022, eleven Places have been designated at a national level (including one *Special Place of Scenic Beauty); Landscape of Oku no Hosomichi is a serial designation spanning ten prefectures.

Prefectural Places of Scenic Beauty
As of 1 May 2021, nine Places have been designated at a prefectural level.

Municipal Places of Scenic Beauty
As of 1 May 2021, thirty-seven Places have been designated at a municipal level.

See also
 Cultural Properties of Japan
 List of Historic Sites of Japan (Ishikawa)
 List of parks and gardens of Ishikawa Prefecture

References

External links
  National Monuments of Ishikawa Prefecture
  Prefectural Monuments of Ishikawa Prefecture

Tourist attractions in Ishikawa Prefecture
Places of Scenic Beauty